Bill Warner may refer to:

 Bill Warner (American football) (1881–1944), American football player and coach
 Bill Warner (writer) (born 1941), writer and critic of Islam
 Bill Warner (motorcyclist) (1969–2013), American motorcycle racer

See also
 William Warner (disambiguation)